Kukruse is an exclave district of the town of Kohtla-Järve, Estonia.